The Diocese of Tehuantepec is a Latin Church ecclesiastical territory or diocese of the Catholic Church in Mexico. It is a suffragan in the ecclesiastical province of the metropolitan Archdiocese of Antequera. It was erected in 1891 from the Dioceses of Veracruz and Antequera.

Bishops

Ordinaries
José Mora y del Rio (1893-1901),appointed, Bishop of Tulancingo, Hidalgo
Carlos de Jesús Mejía y Laguna, C.M. (1902-1907)
Ignacio Placencia y Moreira (1907-1922), appointed Archbishop (Personal Title) of Zacatecas
Jenaro Méndez y del Río (1923-1933), appointed, Bishop of Huajuapan de León, Oaxaca
Jesús Villareal y Fierro (1933-1959), appointed Bishop of San Andrés Tuxtla, Veracruz
José de Jesús Clemens Alba Palacios (1959-1970), appointed Auxiliary Bishop of Antequera, Oaxaca
Arturo Lona Reyes (1971-2000)
Felipe Padilla Cardona (2000-2009), appointed Bishop of Ciudad Obregón, Sonora
Óscar Armando Campos Contreras (2010-2017), appointed, Bishop of Ciudad Guzmán, Jalisco
Crispin Ojeda Márquez (2018-present)

Coadjutor bishop
Felipe Padilla Cardona (1996-2000)

Auxiliary bishop
José Refugio Mercado Díaz (2003-2009)

References

Tehuantepec
Tehuantepec
Tehuantepec
Tehuantepec
1891 establishments in Mexico